Sohagpur S.K. Pilot Model High School is one of the oldest high schools in Belkuchi Upazila of Sirajganj District, in northern Bangladesh. The school was established on January 1, 1913, by  zamindar Rao Bahadur Kalidash Chowdhury, named after his grandfather Shyam Kishore Chowdhury on the bank of the Jamuna River.

It is one of the first 20 of the 310 pilot model schools in Bangladesh created through special projects. The school announced plans to celebrate its 100 years anniversary in 2013. It was nationalised in 2018.

References

High schools in Bangladesh